Oleg Borisovich Maslennikov (born 7 January 1971) is a former Russian professional footballer.

Club career
He made his debut in the Russian Premier League in 1992 for FC Dynamo-Gazovik Tyumen.

External links
 

1971 births
People from Vladimir, Russia
Living people
Soviet footballers
Russian footballers
Association football goalkeepers
FC Tyumen players
FC Lokomotiv Nizhny Novgorod players
FC Sibir Novosibirsk players
FC Luch Vladivostok players
FC Sodovik Sterlitamak players
Russian Premier League players
FC Torpedo Vladimir players
Sportspeople from Vladimir Oblast